Reginald III (c. 1087 – 1148), son of Stephen I and Beatrice of Lorraine, was the count of Burgundy between 1127 and 1148. Previously, he had been the count of Mâcon since his father's death in 1102, with his brother, William of Vienne. His mother, Beatrice of Lorraine, was the daughter of Gerhard, Duke or Lorraine. Pope Callixtus II was his paternal uncle.

He proclaimed independence from Emperor Lothair III, but was defeated by King Conrad III of Germany and forced to relinquish all his lands east of the Jura. The name of the region Franche-Comté is derived from his title, franc-compte, meaning "free count".

About 1130, Reginald married Agatha, daughter of Duke  Simon I of Lorraine. They had a daughter, Beatrice.

In 1148, Reginald was traveling in France when he fell ill with multiple illnesses. He died so suddenly that he could not even appoint a regent for his young daughter, Beatrice I, who succeeded him.

References

Sources

 
 

1090s births
1148 deaths
Anscarids
Counts of Burgundy
Counts of Mâcon